Trigonodactylus persicus is a species of gecko that is endemic to Iran. It is closely related to ''Trigonodactylus arabicus.

References

Trigonodactylus
Reptiles described in 2018